The Hoard memory allocator, or Hoard, is a memory allocator for Linux, OS X, and Microsoft Windows. Hoard is designed to be efficient when used by multithreaded applications on multiprocessor computers. Hoard is distributed under the Apache License, version 2.0.

History
In 2000, its author Emery Berger benchmarked some famous memory allocators and stated Hoard improves the performance of multithreaded applications by providing fast, scalable memory management functions (malloc and free). In particular, it reduces contention for the heap (the central data structure used in dynamic memory allocation) caused when multiple threads allocate or free memory, and avoids the false sharing that can be introduced by memory allocators. At the same time, Hoard has strict bounds on fragmentation.

Hoard continues to be maintained and improved, and is in use by a number of open source and commercial projects.

It has also inspired changes to other memory allocators such as the one in OS X since February 2008 (first released in Mac OS X Snow Leopard).

See also

C dynamic memory allocation
Manual memory management
Dynamic memory allocation
mimalloc

References

External links
 The Hoard web page.
 Emery Berger, Hoard's author and a professor at the University of Massachusetts Amherst.

Memory management
Memory management software